This list of birds of West Virginia includes species documented in the U.S. state of West Virginia and accepted by the West Virginia Bird Records Committee of the Brooks Bird Club (BBC). As of July 2021 the published list contained 354 species. Of them, 65 are classified as rare, five have been introduced to North America, and two are extinct. An additional 14 species are classified as hypothetical (see below) and all of them except the extinct ivory-billed woodpecker are also classified as rare.

This list is presented in the taxonomic sequence of the Check-list of North and Middle American Birds, 7th edition through the 62nd Supplement, published by the American Ornithological Society (AOS). Common and scientific names are also those of the Check-list, except that the common names of families are from the Clements taxonomy because the AOS list does not include them.

Unless otherwise noted, all species listed below are considered to occur regularly in West Virginia as permanent residents, summer or winter visitors, or migrants. The following tags are used to designate some species:

 (R) Rare - species on the West Virginia review list
 (H) Hypothetical - species reported, but with insufficient documentation to confirm
 (I) Introduced - a species that has been introduced to North America by the actions of humans
 (E) Extinct - a recent species that no longer exists

In addition, the International Union for Conservation of Nature (IUCN) classifies one species as endangered , six as vulnerable , and eighteen as near-threatened . The IUCN also lists one species as critically endangered  which the BBC considers extinct.

Ducks, geese, and waterfowl
Order: AnseriformesFamily: Anatidae

The family Anatidae includes the ducks and most duck-like waterfowl, such as geese and swans. These birds are adapted to an aquatic existence with webbed feet, bills which are flattened to a greater or lesser extent, and feathers that are excellent at shedding water due to special oils.

 Black-bellied whistling-duck, Dendrocygna autumnalis (R)
 Snow goose, Anser caerulescens
 Ross's goose, Anser rossii
 Greater white-fronted goose, Anser albifrons
 Brant, Branta bernicla
 Cackling goose, Branta hutchinsii
 Canada goose, Branta canadensis
 Mute swan, Cygnus olor
 Trumpeter swan, Cygnus buccinator
 Tundra swan, Cygnus columbianus
 Wood duck, Aix sponsa
 Blue-winged teal, Spatula discors
 Cinnamon teal, Spatula cyanoptera (R)
 Northern shoveler, Spatula clypeata
 Gadwall, Mareca strepera
 Eurasian wigeon, Mareca penelope (R)
 American wigeon, Mareca americana
 Mallard, Anas platyrhynchos
 American black duck, Anas rubripes
 Northern pintail, Anas acuta
 Green-winged teal, Anas carolinensis
 Canvasback, Aythya valisineria
 Redhead, Aythya americana
 Ring-necked duck, Aythya collaris
 Greater scaup, Aythya marila
 Lesser scaup, Aythya affinis
 King eider, Somateria spectabilis (R)
 Harlequin duck, Histrionicus histrionicus (R)
 Surf scoter, Melanitta perspicillata
 White-winged scoter, Melanitta deglandi
 Black scoter, Melanitta americana 
 Long-tailed duck, Clangula hyemalis 
 Bufflehead, Bucephala albeola
 Common goldeneye, Bucephala clangula
 Hooded merganser, Lophodytes cucullatus
 Common merganser, Mergus merganser
 Red-breasted merganser, Mergus serrator
 Ruddy duck, Oxyura jamaicensis

New World quail
Order: GalliformesFamily: Odontophoridae

The New World quails are small, plump terrestrial birds only distantly related to the quails of the Old World, but named for their similar appearance and habits.

 Northern bobwhite, Colinus virginianus

Pheasants, grouse, and allies
Order: GalliformesFamily: Phasianidae

Phasianidae consists of the pheasants and their allies. These are terrestrial species, variable in size but generally plump with broad relatively short wings. Many species are gamebirds or have been domesticated as a food source for humans.

 Wild turkey, Meleagris gallopavo
 Ruffed grouse, Bonasa umbellus
 Ring-necked pheasant, Phasianus colchicus (I)

Grebes
Order: PodicipediformesFamily: Podicipedidae

Grebes are small to medium-large freshwater diving birds. They have lobed toes and are excellent swimmers and divers. However, they have their feet placed far back on the body, making them quite ungainly on land.

 Pied-billed grebe, Podilymbus podiceps
 Horned grebe, Podiceps auritus 
 Red-necked grebe, Podiceps grisegena
 Eared grebe, Podiceps nigricollis (R)

Pigeons and doves
Order: ColumbiformesFamily: Columbidae

Pigeons and doves are stout-bodied birds with short necks and short slender bills with a fleshy cere.

 Rock pigeon, Columba livia (I)
 Eurasian collared-dove, Streptopelia decaocto (I) (R except in Monroe Co.)
 Passenger pigeon, Ectopistes migratorius (E) 
 Inca dove, Columbina inca (R)
 White-winged dove, Zenaida asiatica
 Mourning dove, Zenaida macroura

Cuckoos
Order: CuculiformesFamily: Cuculidae

The family Cuculidae includes cuckoos, roadrunners, and anis. These birds are of variable size with slender bodies, long tails, and strong legs.

 Yellow-billed cuckoo, Coccyzus americanus
 Black-billed cuckoo, Coccyzus erythropthalmus

Nightjars and allies
Order: CaprimulgiformesFamily: Caprimulgidae

Nightjars are medium-sized nocturnal birds that usually nest on the ground. They have long wings, short legs, and very short bills. Most have small feet, of little use for walking, and long pointed wings. Their soft plumage is cryptically colored to resemble bark or leaves.

 Lesser nighthawk, Chordeiles acutipennis (R)
 Common nighthawk, Chordeiles minor
 Chuck-will's-widow, Antrostomus carolinensis
 Eastern whip-poor-will, Antrostomus vociferus

Swifts
Order: ApodiformesFamily: Apodidae

The swifts are small birds which spend the majority of their lives flying. These birds have very short legs and never settle voluntarily on the ground, perching instead only on vertical surfaces. Many swifts have long swept-back wings which resemble a crescent or boomerang.

 Chimney swift, Chaetura pelagica

Hummingbirds
Order: ApodiformesFamily: Trochilidae

Hummingbirds are small birds capable of hovering in mid-air due to the rapid flapping of their wings. They are the only birds that can fly backwards.

 Mexican violetear, Colibri thalassinus (R)
 Ruby-throated hummingbird, Archilochus colubris
 Black-chinned hummingbird, Archilochus alexandri (R)
 Rufous hummingbird, Selasphorus rufus

Rails, gallinules, and coots
Order: GruiformesFamily: Rallidae

Rallidae is a large family of small to medium-sized birds which includes the rails, crakes, coots, and gallinules. The most typical family members occupy dense vegetation in damp environments near lakes, swamps, or rivers. In general they are shy and secretive birds, making them difficult to observe. Most species have strong legs and long toes which are well adapted to soft uneven surfaces. They tend to have short, rounded wings and to be weak fliers.

 Clapper rail, Rallus crepitans (R) (H)
 King rail, Rallus elegans (R) 
 Virginia rail, Rallus limicola
 Sora, Porzana carolina
 Common gallinule, Gallinula galeata
 American coot, Fulica americana
 Purple gallinule, Porphyrio martinicus
 Yellow rail, Coturnicops noveboracensis (R)
 Black rail, Laterallus jamaicensis (R)

Limpkin
Order: GruiformesFamily: Aramidae

The limpkin is an odd bird that looks like a large rail, but is skeletally closer to the cranes. 

Limpkin, Aramus guarauna (R)

Cranes
Order: GruiformesFamily: Gruidae

Cranes are large, long-legged, and long-necked birds. Unlike the similar-looking but unrelated herons, cranes fly with necks outstretched, not pulled back. Most have elaborate and noisy courting displays or "dances".

 Sandhill crane, Antigone canadensis

Stilts and avocets
Order: CharadriiformesFamily: Recurvirostridae

Recurvirostridae is a family of large wading birds which includes the avocets and stilts. The avocets have long legs and long up-curved bills. The stilts have extremely long legs and long, thin, straight bills.

 Black-necked stilt, Himantopus mexicanus (R)
 American avocet, Recurvirostra americana

Plovers and lapwings
Order: CharadriiformesFamily: Charadriidae

The family Charadriidae includes the plovers, dotterels, and lapwings. They are small to medium-sized birds with compact bodies, short thick necks, and long, usually pointed, wings. They are found in open country worldwide, mostly in habitats near water.

 Black-bellied plover, Pluvialis squatarola
 American golden-plover, Pluvialis dominica
 Killdeer, Charadrius vociferus
 Semipalmated plover, Charadrius semipalmatus
 Piping plover, Charadrius melodus (R)

Sandpipers and allies
Order: CharadriiformesFamily: Scolopacidae

Scolopacidae is a large diverse family of small to medium-sized shorebirds including the sandpipers, curlews, godwits, shanks, tattlers, woodcocks, snipes, dowitchers, and phalaropes. The majority of these species eat small invertebrates picked out of the mud or soil. Different lengths of legs and bills enable multiple species to feed in the same habitat, particularly on the coast, without direct competition for food.

 Upland sandpiper, Bartramia longicauda
 Whimbrel, Numenius phaeopus (R)
 Hudsonian godwit, Limosa haemastica (R)
 Marbled godwit, Limosa fedoa (R)
 Ruddy turnstone, Arenaria interpres (R)
 Great knot, Calidris tenuirostris (R) 
 Red knot, Calidris canutus (R)
 Stilt sandpiper, Calidris himantopus
 Sanderling, Calidris alba
 Dunlin, Calidris alpina
 Baird's sandpiper, Calidris bairdii
 Least sandpiper, Calidris minutilla
 White-rumped sandpiper, Calidris fuscicollis
 Buff-breasted sandpiper, Calidris subruficollis 
 Pectoral sandpiper, Calidris melanotos
 Semipalmated sandpiper, Calidris pusilla 
 Western sandpiper, Calidris mauri
 Short-billed dowitcher, Limnodromus griseus
 Long-billed dowitcher, Limnodromus scolopaceus
 American woodcock, Scolopax minor
 Wilson's snipe, Gallinago delicata
 Spotted sandpiper, Actitis macularius
 Solitary sandpiper, Tringa solitaria
 Lesser yellowlegs, Tringa flavipes
 Willet, Tringa semipalmata
 Greater yellowlegs, Tringa melanoleuca
 Wilson's phalarope, Phalaropus tricolor
 Red-necked phalarope, Phalaropus lobatus
 Red phalarope, Phalaropus fulicarius

Skuas and jaegers
Order: CharadriiformesFamily: Stercorariidae

Skuas and jaegers are in general medium to large birds, typically with gray or brown plumage, often with white markings on the wings. They have longish bills with hooked tips and webbed feet with sharp claws. They look like large dark gulls, but have a fleshy cere above the upper mandible. They are strong, acrobatic fliers.

 Parasitic jaeger, Stercorarius parasiticus (R)
 Long-tailed jaeger, Stercorarius longicaudus (R)

Gulls, terns, and skimmers
Order: CharadriiformesFamily: Laridae

Laridae is a family of medium to large seabirds and includes gulls, terns, and skimmers. Gulls are typically gray or white, often with black markings on the head or wings. They have stout, longish bills and webbed feet. Terns are a group of generally medium to large seabirds typically with gray or white plumage, often with black markings on the head. Most terns hunt fish by diving but some pick insects off the surface of fresh water. Terns are generally long-lived birds, with several species known to live in excess of 30 years. Skimmers are a small family of tropical tern-like birds. They have an elongated lower mandible which they use to feed by flying low over the water surface and skimming the water for small fish.

 Black-legged kittiwake, Rissa tridactyla (R)
 Sabine's gull, Xema sabini (R)
 Bonaparte's gull, Chroicocephalus philadelphia
 Little gull, Hydrocoloeus minutus (R) (H)
 Laughing gull, Leucophaeus atricilla (R)
 Franklin's gull, Leucophaeus pipixcan (R)
 Ring-billed gull, Larus delawarensis
 Herring gull, Larus argentatus
 Iceland gull, Larus glaucoides
 Lesser black-backed gull, Larus fuscus
 Glaucous gull, Larus hyperboreus
 Great black-backed gull, Larus marinus
 Kelp gull, Larus dominicanus (R) (H)
 Sooty tern, Onychoprion fuscatus (R)
 Least tern, Sternula antillarum (R)
 Caspian tern, Hydroprogne caspia
 Black tern, Chlidonias niger
 Common tern, Sterna hirundo
 Forster's tern, Sterna forsteri

Loons
Order: GaviiformesFamily: Gaviidae

Loons are aquatic birds, the size of a large duck, to which they are unrelated. Their plumage is largely gray or black, and they have spear-shaped bills. Loons swim well and fly adequately, but are almost hopeless on land, because their legs are placed towards the rear of the body.

 Red-throated loon, Gavia stellata
 Pacific loon, Gavia pacifica (R)
 Common loon, Gavia immer

Storks
Order: CiconiiformesFamily: Ciconiidae

Storks are large, heavy, long-legged, long-necked wading birds with long stout bills and wide wingspans. They lack the powder down that other wading birds such as herons, spoonbills, and ibises use to clean off fish slime. Storks lack a pharynx and are mute.

 Wood stork, Mycteria americana (R)

Frigatebirds
Order: SuliformesFamily: Fregatidae

Frigatebirds are large seabirds usually found over tropical oceans. They are large, black, or black-and-white, with long wings and deeply forked tails. The males have colored inflatable throat pouches. They do not swim or walk and cannot take off from a flat surface. Having the largest wingspan-to-body-weight ratio of any bird, they are essentially aerial, able to stay aloft for more than a week.

Magnificent frigatebird, Fregata magnificens (R) (H)

Anhingas
Order: SuliformesFamily: Anhingidae

Anhingas are cormorant-like water birds with very long necks and long straight beaks. They are fish eaters which often swim with only their neck above the water.

 Anhinga, Anhinga anhinga (R) (H)

Cormorants and shags
Order: SuliformesFamily: Phalacrocoracidae

Cormorants are medium-to-large aquatic birds, usually with mainly dark plumage and areas of colored skin on the face. The bill is long, thin, and sharply hooked. Their feet are four-toed and webbed.

 Great cormorant, Phalacrocorax carbo (R)
 Double-crested cormorant, Nannopterum auritum

Pelicans
Order: PelecaniformesFamily: Pelecanidae

Pelicans are very large water birds with a distinctive pouch under their beak. Like other birds in the order Pelecaniformes, they have four webbed toes.

 American white pelican, Pelecanus erythrorhynchos
 Brown pelican, Pelecanus occidentalis (R)

Herons, egrets, and bitterns
Order: PelecaniformesFamily: Ardeidae

The family Ardeidae contains the herons, egrets, and bitterns. Herons and egrets are medium to large wading birds with long necks and legs. Bitterns tend to be shorter necked and more secretive. Members of Ardeidae fly with their necks retracted, unlike other long-necked birds such as storks, ibises, and spoonbills.

 American bittern, Botaurus lentiginosus
 Least bittern, Ixobrychus exilis
 Great blue heron, Ardea herodias
 Great egret, Ardea alba
 Snowy egret, Egretta thula
 Little blue heron, Egretta caerulea
 Tricolored heron, Egretta tricolor (R)
 Cattle egret, Bubulcus ibis
 Green heron, Butorides virescens
 Black-crowned night-heron, Nycticorax nycticorax
 Yellow-crowned night-heron, Nyctanassa violacea

Ibises and spoonbills
Order: PelecaniformesFamily: Threskiornithidae

The family Threskiornithidae includes the ibises and spoonbills. They have long, broad wings. Their bodies tend to be elongated, the neck more so, with rather long legs. The bill is also long, decurved in the case of the ibises, straight and distinctively flattened in the spoonbills.

 White ibis, Eudocimus albus
 Glossy ibis, Plegadis falcinellus (R)
 White-faced ibis, Plegadis chihi (R)
 Roseate spoonbill, Platalea ajaja (R)

New World vultures
Order: CathartiformesFamily: Cathartidae

The New World vultures are not closely related to Old World vultures, but superficially resemble them because of convergent evolution. Like the Old World vultures, they are scavengers. However, unlike Old World vultures, which find carcasses by sight, New World vultures have a good sense of smell with which they locate carcasses.

 Black vulture, Coragyps atratus
 Turkey vulture, Cathartes aura

Osprey
Order: AccipitriformesFamily: Pandionidae

Pandionidae is a monotypic family of fish-eating birds of prey.  Its single species possesses a very large and powerful hooked beak, strong legs, strong talons, and keen eyesight.

 Osprey, Pandion haliaetus

Hawks, eagles, and kites
Order: AccipitriformesFamily: Accipitridae

Accipitridae is a family of birds of prey which includes hawks, eagles, kites, harriers, and Old World vultures. These birds have very large powerful hooked beaks for tearing flesh from their prey, strong legs, powerful talons, and keen eyesight.

 White-tailed kite, Elanus leucurus (R) (H)
 Swallow-tailed kite, Elanoides forficatus
 Golden eagle, Aquila chrysaetos
 Northern harrier, Circus hudsonius
 Sharp-shinned hawk, Accipiter striatus
 Cooper's hawk, Accipiter cooperii
 Northern goshawk, Accipiter gentilis
 Bald eagle, Haliaeetus leucocephalus
 Mississippi kite, Ictinia mississippiensis
 Red-shouldered hawk, Buteo lineatus
 Broad-winged hawk, Buteo platypterus
 Swainson's hawk, Buteo swainsoni (R)
 Red-tailed hawk, Buteo jamaicensis
 Rough-legged hawk, Buteo lagopus

Barn-owls
Order: StrigiformesFamily: Tytonidae

Owls in the family Tytonidae are medium to large owls with large heads and characteristic heart-shaped faces.

 Barn owl, Tyto alba

Owls
Order: StrigiformesFamily: Strigidae

Typical or "true" owls are small to large solitary nocturnal birds of prey. They have large forward-facing eyes and ears, a hawk-like beak, and a conspicuous circle of feathers around each eye called a facial disk.

 Eastern screech-owl, Megascops asio
 Great horned owl, Bubo virginianus
 Snowy owl, Bubo scandiacus 
 Northern hawk owl, Surnia ulula (R) (H)
 Barred owl, Strix varia
 Long-eared owl, Asio otus
 Short-eared owl, Asio flammeus
 Northern saw-whet owl, Aegolius acadicus

Kingfishers
Order: CoraciiformesFamily: Alcedinidae

Kingfishers are medium-sized birds with large heads, long, pointed bills, short legs, and stubby tails.

 Belted kingfisher, Megaceryle alcyon

Woodpeckers
Order: PiciformesFamily: Picidae

Woodpeckers are small to medium-sized birds with chisel-like beaks, short legs, stiff tails, and long tongues used for capturing insects. Some species have feet with two toes pointing forward and two backward, while several species have only three toes. Many woodpeckers have the habit of tapping noisily on tree trunks with their beaks.

 Red-headed woodpecker, Melanerpes erythrocephalus 
 Red-bellied woodpecker, Melanerpes carolinus
 Yellow-bellied sapsucker, Sphyrapicus varius
 Black-backed woodpecker, Picoides arcticus (R) (H)
 Downy woodpecker, Dryobates pubescens
 Hairy woodpecker, Dryobates villosus
 Northern flicker, Colaptes auratus
 Pileated woodpecker, Dryocopus pileatus
 Ivory-billed woodpecker, Campephilus principalis (H) (E)

Falcons and caracaras
Order: FalconiformesFamily: Falconidae

Falconidae is a family of diurnal birds of prey, notably the falcons and caracaras. They differ from hawks, eagles, and kites in that they kill with their beaks instead of their talons.

 American kestrel, Falco sparverius
 Merlin, Falco columbarius
 Gyrfalcon, Falco rusticolus (R) (H)
 Peregrine falcon, Falco peregrinus

New World and African parrots
Order: PsittaciformesFamily: Psittacidae

Characteristic features of parrots include a strong curved bill, an upright stance, strong legs, and clawed zygodactyl feet. Many parrots are vividly colored, and some are multi-colored. Most of the more than 150 species in this family are found in the New World.

 Carolina parakeet, Conuropsis carolinensis (E)

Tyrant flycatchers
Order: PasseriformesFamily: Tyrannidae

Tyrant flycatchers are Passerine birds which occur throughout North and South America. They superficially resemble the Old World flycatchers, but are more robust and have stronger bills. They do not have the sophisticated vocal capabilities of the songbirds. Most, but not all, are rather plain. As the name implies, most are insectivorous.

 Ash-throated flycatcher, Myiarchus cinerascens (R)
 Great crested flycatcher, Myiarchus crinitus
 Western kingbird, Tyrannus verticalis (R)
 Eastern kingbird, Tyrannus tyrannus
 Scissor-tailed flycatcher, Tyrannus forficatus (R)
 Fork-tailed flycatcher, Tyrannus savana (R)
 Olive-sided flycatcher, Contopus cooperi 
 Eastern wood-pewee, Contopus virens
 Yellow-bellied flycatcher, Empidonax flaviventris
 Acadian flycatcher, Empidonax virescens
 Alder flycatcher, Empidonax alnorum
 Willow flycatcher, Empidonax traillii
 Least flycatcher, Empidonax minimus
 Eastern phoebe, Sayornis phoebe
 Say's phoebe, Sayornis saya (R)
 Vermilion flycatcher, Pyrocephalus rubinus (R) (H)

Vireos, shrike-babblers, and erpornis
Order: PasseriformesFamily: Vireonidae

The vireos are a group of small to medium-sized passerine birds mostly restricted to the New World, though a few other species in the family are found in Asia. They are typically greenish in color and resemble wood-warblers apart from their heavier bills.

 White-eyed vireo, Vireo griseus
 Bell's vireo, Vireo bellii (R) 
 Yellow-throated vireo, Vireo flavifrons
 Blue-headed vireo, Vireo solitarius
 Philadelphia vireo, Vireo philadelphicus
 Warbling vireo, Vireo gilvus
 Red-eyed vireo, Vireo olivaceus

Shrikes
Order: PasseriformesFamily: Laniidae

Shrikes are passerine birds known for their habit of catching other birds and small animals and impaling the uneaten portions of their bodies on thorns. A shrike's beak is hooked, like that of a typical bird of prey.

 Loggerhead shrike, Lanius ludovicianus 
 Northern shrike, Lanius borealis

Crows, jays, and magpies
Order: PasseriformesFamily: Corvidae

The family Corvidae includes crows, ravens, jays, choughs, magpies, treepies, nutcrackers, and ground jays. Corvids are above average in size among the Passeriformes, and some of the larger species show high levels of intelligence.

 Blue jay, Cyanocitta cristata
 Black-billed magpie, Pica hudsonia (R)
 American crow, Corvus brachyrhynchos
 Fish crow, Corvus ossifragus
 Common raven, Corvus corax

Tits, chickadees, and titmice
Order: PasseriformesFamily: Paridae

The Paridae are mainly small stocky woodland species with short stout bills. Some have crests. They are adaptable birds, with a mixed diet including seeds and insects.

 Carolina chickadee, Poecile carolinensis
 Black-capped chickadee, Poecile atricapillus
 Boreal chickadee, Poecile hudsonicus (R)
 Tufted titmouse, Baeolophus bicolor

Larks
Order: PasseriformesFamily: Alaudidae

Larks are small terrestrial birds with often extravagant songs and display flights. Most larks are fairly dull in appearance. Their food is insects and seeds.

 Horned lark, Eremophila alpestris

Swallows
Order: PasseriformesFamily: Hirundinidae

The family Hirundinidae is adapted to aerial feeding. They have a slender streamlined body, long pointed wings, and a short bill with a wide gape. The feet are adapted to perching rather than walking, and the front toes are partially joined at the base.

 Bank swallow, Riparia riparia
 Tree swallow, Tachycineta bicolor
 Northern rough-winged swallow, Stelgidopteryx serripennis
 Purple martin, Progne subis
 Barn swallow, Hirundo rustica
 Cliff swallow, Petrochelidon pyrrhonota
 Cave swallow, Petrochelidon fulva (R)

Kinglets
Order: PasseriformesFamily: Regulidae

The kinglets and "crests" are a small family of birds which resemble some warblers. They are very small insectivorous birds. The adults have colored crowns, giving rise to their name.

 Ruby-crowned kinglet, Corthylio calendula
 Golden-crowned kinglet, Regulus satrapa

Waxwings
Order: PasseriformesFamily: Bombycillidae

The waxwings are a group of passerine birds with soft silky plumage and unique red tips to some of the wing feathers. In the Bohemian and cedar waxwings, these tips look like sealing wax and give the group its name. These are arboreal birds of northern forests. They live on insects in summer and berries in winter.

 Bohemian waxwing, Bombycilla garrulus (R)
 Cedar waxwing, Bombycilla cedrorum

Nuthatches
Order: PasseriformesFamily: Sittidae

Nuthatches are small woodland birds. They have the unusual ability to climb down trees head first, unlike other birds which can only go upwards. Nuthatches have big heads, short tails, and powerful bills and feet.

 Red-breasted nuthatch, Sitta canadensis
 White-breasted nuthatch, Sitta carolinensis

Treecreepers 
Order: PasseriformesFamily: Certhiidae

Treecreepers are small woodland birds, brown above and white below. They have thin pointed down-curved bills, which they use to extricate insects from bark. They have stiff tail feathers, like woodpeckers, which they use to support themselves on vertical trees.

 Brown creeper, Certhia americana

Gnatcatchers
Order: PasseriformesFamily: Polioptilidae

These dainty birds resemble Old World warblers in their structure and habits, moving restlessly through the foliage seeking insects. The gnatcatchers are mainly soft bluish gray in color and have the typical insectivore's long sharp bill. Many species have distinctive black head patterns (especially males) and long, regularly cocked, black-and-white tails.

 Blue-gray gnatcatcher, Polioptila caerulea

Wrens
Order: PasseriformesFamily: Troglodytidae

Wrens are small and inconspicuous birds, except for their loud songs. They have short wings and thin down-turned bills. Several species often hold their tails upright. All are insectivorous.

 House wren, Troglodytes aedon
 Winter wren, Troglodytes hiemalis
 Sedge wren, Cistothorus platensis
 Marsh wren, Cistothorus palustris
 Carolina wren, Thryothorus ludovicianus
 Bewick's wren, Thryomanes bewickii (R)

Mockingbirds and thrashers
Order: PasseriformesFamily: Mimidae

The mimids are a family of passerine birds which includes thrashers, mockingbirds, tremblers, and the New World catbirds. These birds are notable for their vocalization, especially their remarkable ability to mimic a wide variety of birds and other sounds heard outdoors. The species tend towards dull grays and browns in their appearance.

 Gray catbird, Dumetella carolinensis
 Brown thrasher, Toxostoma rufum
 Northern mockingbird, Mimus polyglottos

Starlings
Order: PasseriformesFamily: Sturnidae

Starlings and mynas are small to medium-sized Old World passerine birds with strong feet. Their flight is strong and direct and most are very gregarious. Their preferred habitat is fairly open country, and they eat insects and fruit. The plumage of several species is dark with a metallic sheen.

 European starling, Sturnus vulgaris (I)

Thrushes and allies
Order: PasseriformesFamily: Turdidae

The thrushes are a group of passerine birds that occur mainly but not exclusively in the Old World. They are plump, soft plumaged, small to medium-sized insectivores or sometimes omnivores, often feeding on the ground. Many have attractive songs.

 Eastern bluebird, Sialia sialis
 Veery, Catharus fuscescens
 Gray-cheeked thrush, Catharus minimus
 Bicknell's thrush, Catharus bicknelli (R) 
 Swainson's thrush, Catharus ustulatus
 Hermit thrush, Catharus guttatus
 Wood thrush, Hylocichla mustelina 
 American robin, Turdus migratorius
 Varied thrush, Ixoreus naevius (R)

Old World sparrows
Order: PasseriformesFamily: Passeridae

Old World sparrows are small passerine birds. In general, sparrows tend to be small plump brownish or grayish birds with short tails and short powerful beaks. Sparrows are seed eaters, but they also consume small insects.

 House sparrow, Passer domesticus (I)

Wagtails and pipits
Order: PasseriformesFamily: Motacillidae

Motacillidae is a family of small passerine birds with medium to long tails. They include the wagtails, longclaws, and pipits. They are slender ground-feeding insectivores of open country.

 American pipit, Anthus rubescens

Finches, euphonias, and allies
Order: PasseriformesFamily: Fringillidae

Finches are seed-eating passerine birds that are small to moderately large and have a strong beak, usually conical and in some species very large. All have twelve tail feathers and nine primaries. These birds have a bouncing flight with alternating bouts of flapping and gliding on closed wings, and most sing well.

 Evening grosbeak, Coccothraustes vespertinus
 Pine grosbeak, Pinicola enucleator (R)
 House finch, Haemorhous mexicanus (native to the southwestern U.S.; introduced in the east)
 Purple finch, Haemorhous purpureus
 Common redpoll, Acanthis flammea
 Hoary redpoll, Acanthis hornemanni (R)
 Red crossbill, Loxia curvirostra
 White-winged crossbill, Loxia leucoptera
 Pine siskin, Spinus pinus
 American goldfinch, Spinus tristis
 European goldfinch, Carduelis carduelis (R)

Longspurs and snow buntings
Order: PasseriformesFamily: Calcariidae

The Calcariidae are a group of passerine birds that had been traditionally grouped with the New World sparrows, but differ in a number of respects and are usually found in open grassy areas.

 Lapland longspur, Calcarius lapponicus
 Smith's longspur, Calcarius pictus (R)
 Snow bunting, Plectrophenax nivalis

New World sparrows
Order: PasseriformesFamily: Passerellidae

Until 2017, these species were considered part of the family Emberizidae. Most of the species are known as sparrows, but these birds are not closely related to the Old World sparrows which are in the family Passeridae. Many of these have distinctive head patterns.

 Bachman's sparrow, Peucaea aestivalis (R) 
 Grasshopper sparrow, Ammodramus savannarum
 Lark sparrow, Chondestes grammacus
 Lark bunting, Calamospiza melanocorys (R)
 Chipping sparrow, Spizella passerina
 Clay-colored sparrow, Spizella pallida
 Field sparrow, Spizella pusilla
 Fox sparrow, Passerella iliaca
 American tree sparrow, Spizelloides arborea
 Dark-eyed junco, Junco hyemalis
 White-crowned sparrow, Zonotrichia leucophrys
 Harris's sparrow, Zonotrichia querula (R)
 White-throated sparrow, Zonotrichia albicollis
 Vesper sparrow, Pooecetes gramineus
 LeConte's sparrow, Ammospiza leconteii
 Nelson's sparrow, Ammospiza nelsoni
 Baird's sparrow, Centronyx bairdii (R) (H)
 Henslow's sparrow, Centronyx henslowii 
 Savannah sparrow, Passerculus sandwichensis
 Song sparrow, Melospiza melodia
 Lincoln's sparrow, Melospiza lincolnii
 Swamp sparrow, Melospiza georgiana
 Canyon towhee, Melozone fusca (R) (H)
 Green-tailed towhee, Pipilo chlorurus (R)
 Spotted towhee, Pipilo maculatus (R) (H)
 Eastern towhee, Pipilo erythrophthalmus

Yellow-breasted chat
Order: PasseriformesFamily: Icteriidae

This species was historically placed in the wood-warblers (Parulidae) but nonetheless most authorities were unsure if it belonged there. It was placed in its own family in 2017.

Yellow-breasted chat, Icteria virens

Troupials and allies
Order: PasseriformesFamily: Icteridae

The icterids are a group of small to medium-sized, often colorful passerine birds restricted to the New World and include the grackles, New World blackbirds, and New World orioles. Most species have black as a predominant plumage color which is often enlivened by yellow, orange, or red.

 Yellow-headed blackbird, Xanthocephalus xanthocephalus
 Bobolink, Dolichonyx oryzivorus
 Eastern meadowlark, Sturnella magna
 Western meadowlark, Sturnella neglecta (R)
 Orchard oriole, Icterus spurius
 Baltimore oriole, Icterus galbula
 Red-winged blackbird, Agelaius phoeniceus
 Brown-headed cowbird, Molothrus ater
 Rusty blackbird, Euphagus carolinus 
 Brewer's blackbird, Euphagus cyanocephalus (R)
 Common grackle, Quiscalus quiscula

New World warblers
Order: PasseriformesFamily: Parulidae

The wood-warblers are a group of small often colorful passerine birds restricted to the New World. Most are arboreal, but some are more terrestrial. Most members of this family are insectivores.

 Ovenbird, Seiurus aurocapilla
 Worm-eating warbler, Helmitheros vermivorum
 Louisiana waterthrush, Parkesia motacilla
 Northern waterthrush, Parkesia noveboracensis
 Golden-winged warbler, Vermivora chrysoptera 
 Blue-winged warbler, Vermivora cyanoptera
 Black-and-white warbler, Mniotilta varia
 Prothonotary warbler, Protonotaria citrea
 Swainson's warbler, Limnothlypis swainsonii
 Tennessee warbler, Leiothlypis peregrina
 Orange-crowned warbler, Leiothlypis celata
 Nashville warbler, Leiothlypis ruficapilla
 Virginia's warbler, Leiothlypis virginiae (R)
 Connecticut warbler, Oporornis agilis
 Mourning warbler, Geothlypis philadelphia
 Kentucky warbler, Geothlypis formosa
 Common yellowthroat, Geothlypis trichas
 Hooded warbler, Setophaga citrina
 American redstart, Setophaga ruticilla
 Kirtland's warbler, Setophaga kirtlandii (R) 
 Cape May warbler, Setophaga tigrina
 Cerulean warbler, Setophaga cerulea 
 Northern parula, Setophaga americana
 Magnolia warbler, Setophaga magnolia
 Bay-breasted warbler, Setophaga castanea
 Blackburnian warbler, Setophaga fusca
 Yellow warbler, Setophaga petechia
 Chestnut-sided warbler, Setophaga pensylvanica
 Blackpoll warbler, Setophaga striata
 Black-throated blue warbler, Setophaga caerulescens
 Palm warbler, Setophaga palmarum
 Pine warbler, Setophaga pinus
 Yellow-rumped warbler, Setophaga coronata
 Yellow-throated warbler, Setophaga dominica
 Prairie warbler, Setophaga discolor
 Black-throated gray warbler, Setophaga nigrescens (R)
 Black-throated green warbler, Setophaga virens
 Canada warbler, Cardellina canadensis
 Wilson's warbler, Cardellina pusilla

Cardinals and allies
Order: PasseriformesFamily: Cardinalidae

The cardinals are a family of robust seed-eating birds with strong bills. They are typically associated with open woodland. The sexes usually have distinct plumages.

 Summer tanager, Piranga rubra
 Scarlet tanager, Piranga olivacea
 Western tanager, Piranga ludoviciana (R)
 Northern cardinal, Cardinalis cardinalis
 Rose-breasted grosbeak, Pheucticus ludovicianus
 Black-headed grosbeak, Pheucticus melanocephalus (R)
 Blue grosbeak, Passerina caerulea
 Indigo bunting, Passerina cyanea
 Painted bunting, Passerina ciris (R) 
 Dickcissel, Spiza americana

References

See also
 Lists of birds by region
West Virginia State Wildlife Center, a small zoo featuring native West Virginia animals
Fauna of West Virginia
List of West Virginia wildlife management areas

Birds
West Virginia